Sanju Aau Sanjana is a 2010 Odia film screenplay & directed by Ashok Pati with dialogue by Rajaniranjan, produced by Lutu Mohanty, and starring Babushaan, Parijaat, and Mihir Das.
It is a remake of the Telugu film Parugu starring Allu Arjun, Sheela, and Prakash Raj.

Plot
Parsuram Paikray is an influential personality in the city. He has a dream that both of his daughters Sanjana and Anjana should marry upon his choice. Anjana falls in love with Amar and left home after get married. Parsuram kidnapped all of Amar's friends with his goons to track his daughter. Sanjay is one of Amar's friend, who get kidnapped. Sanju falls in love with Parsuram's second daughter Sanjana and both escaped from his house. Parsuram sent his goons to kill Sanju and rescue Sanjana. Sanju survives and at last marry Sanjana.

Cast
 Babushaan as Sanju
 Parijaat as Sanjana
 Mihir Das as Parshuram Paikray
 Usasi Misra as Anjana
 Chakradhar Jena
 Papu Pam Pam
 Pushpa Panda
 Samaresh Routray

Music
The music of the film composed by Prashant Padhi.
The tracks from the film include:

Awards
 Best film Award of 2010 in 2nd Tarang Cine Awards 2011
 Best Actor of 2010 in 2nd Tarang Cine Awards 2011
 Best cinematographer of 2010 in 2nd Tarang Cine Awards 2011
 Best Dance Director of 2010 in 2nd Tarang Cine Awards 2011

References

External links
 
 

2010 films
Odia remakes of Telugu films
2010s Odia-language films
Films directed by Ashok Pati